Truelove may refer to:

Ships 
 Truelove (1764 ship), a whaler and cargo ship
 The Truelove, ship featured in the novel Clarissa Oakes (sold under the title of The Truelove in the US)

People 
 Amanda Truelove (born 1961), cellist from the United Kingdom
 Ayala Truelove (born 1975), Israeli international football striker
 Denver V. Truelove (1919–1943), American bombardier
 Edward Truelove (1809–1899), English radical publisher
 George Truelove (born 1975), professional UK rugby player
 Jack Truelove (born 1995), English football player
 John Truelove (born 1968), British record producer
 Owen Truelove (1937–2006), first man to fly from the UK to New Zealand with a motor glider
 William Truelove, Canadian admiral

Other 
 Truelove's Gutter, 2009 album by Richard Hawley
 Truelove Eyre, legendary founder of the Eyre and Ayre family

See also 
 True Love (disambiguation)